is a railway station in Miyagino-ku in Sendai, Miyagi, Japan operated by East Japan Railway Company (JR East).

Lines
Fukudamachi Station is served by the Senseki Line.

Station layout
The station has one island platform connected to the station building by a footbridge. The station is staffed.

Platforms

History
Fukudamachi Station opened on　June 5, 1925 as a station on the Miyagi Electric Railway. The line was nationalized on May 1, 1944. The station was absorbed into the JR East network upon the privatization of JNR on April 1, 1987.

Passenger statistics
In fiscal 2018, the station was used by an average of 3,971 passengers daily (boarding passengers only).

Surrounding area
 
Sendai Fukudamachi Post Office

See also
 List of railway stations in Japan

References

External links

  

Railway stations in Sendai
Senseki Line
Railway stations in Japan opened in 1925
Stations of East Japan Railway Company